Engine displacement is the measure of the cylinder volume swept by all of the pistons of a piston engine, excluding the combustion chambers. It is commonly used as an expression of an engine's size, and by extension as a loose indicator of the power an engine might be capable of producing and the amount of fuel it should be expected to consume. For this reason displacement is one of the measures often used in advertising, as well as regulating, motor vehicles.

It is usually expressed using the metric units of cubic centimetres (cc or cm3, equivalent to millilitres) or litres (l or L), orparticularly in the United States cubic inches (CID, cu in, or in3).

Definition
The overall displacement for a typical reciprocating piston engine is calculated by multiplying together three values; the distance travelled by the piston (the stroke length), the circular area of the cylinder, and the number of cylinders in the whole engine.

The formula is:

Using this formula for non-typical types of engine, such as the Wankel design and the oval-piston type used in Honda NR motorcycles, can sometimes yield misleading results when attempting to compare engines. Manufacturers and regulators may develop and use specialised formulae to determine a comparative nominal displacement for variant engine types.

Governmental regulations

In several countries fees and taxes levied on road vehicles by transport authorities are scaled in proportion to engine displacement. In countries where this is practised, vehicle manufacturers often seek to increase power output through higher-revving engines or turbocharging, instead of increasing the displacement.

Examples of countries where the road taxes are based upon engine displacement:
 In some European countries, and which predates the EU, there is one charge for engines over 1.0 litre, and another at the level of about 1.6 litres.
 In the United Kingdom, cars registered after 1 March 2001 are taxed based on the exhaust emissions. However, cars registered before this date are taxed based on engine displacement. Cars under 1549 cm3 qualify for a lower tax rate.
 In Japan, the engine displacement is one of the factors (along with overall vehicle size and power output) used to determine the vehicle size class and therefore the cost of road tax for the vehicle
 In France and some other EU countries, mopeds with a displacement of less than  can be driven with minimum qualifications. This led to all light motorbikes having a displacement of about 49.9 cm3.
 In many areas of the United States, Canada (except Quebec), Australia and New Zealand, the road taxes are not based on engine displacement. However, the engine displacement is often used in low-powered scooters or mopeds to determine whether a licence is required to operate the vehicle.

Wankel engines are able to produce higher power levels for a given displacement. Therefore, they are generally taxed as 1.5 times their stated physical displacement (1.3 litres becomes effectively 2.0, 2.0 becomes effectively 3.0), although actual power outputs can be higher than suggested by this conversion factor.

Automotive model names 
Historically, many car model names have included their engine displacement. Examples include the 1923–1930 Cadillac Series 353 (powered by a 353 Cubic inch/5.8-litre engine), and the 1963–1968 BMW 1800 (a 1.8-litre engine) and Lexus LS 400 with a 3,968 cc engine.  This was especially common in US muscle cars, like the Ford Mustang Boss 302 and 429, and later GT 5.0L, The Plymouth Roadrunner 440, and the Chevrolet Chevelle SS 396 and 454. 

However, trends towards turbocharging and hybrid/electric drivetrains since 2010 have resulted in far fewer model names being based on the engine displacement.

See also
 Active Fuel Management
 Bore (engine)
 Compression ratio
 Stroke (engine)
 Variable displacement

References 

Displacement